Greverud Station is a railway station at Greverud in Oppegård, Norway. Located on the Østfold Line it is served by the Oslo Commuter Rail line L2 operated by Vy with two hourly services. The station was opened in 1919.

External links

Railway stations in Oppegård
Railway stations on the Østfold Line
Railway stations opened in 1939
1939 establishments in Norway